Šta mi radiš is the fifth studio album by Zdravko Čolić, released in 1983.

Released by Jugoton, it would be the last studio album Čolić did for the label as the two parties parted ways after five hugely successful albums.

Track listing
Cherie, Cherie (Đ. Novković, M. Tucaković)
Afrika (Africa) (M. Bajagić - M. Aleksić, M. Bajagić)
Stanica Podlugovi (Podlugovi Train Station) (K. Kovač, V. Dijak)
Crne čarape (Black Stockings) (K. Kovač, M. Tucaković)
Konačno sam (Alone At Last) (Kika Mac, M. Tucaković)
Šta mi radiš (What Are You Doing To Me) (K. Kovač, M. Tucaković)
Daj mi to (Give Me That) (Đ. Novković, K. Kovač - Đ. Novković)
Tvoje oči (Your Eyes) (M. Bajagić - M. Aleksić, M. Bajagić)
Pobjegnimo koji dan na more (Let's Run Away To Sea For A Couple Of Days) (A. Dedić)
Brodolomci (Castaways) (K. Kovač, A. Dedić)
Doviđenja (Goodbye) (K. Kovač, A. Dedić)

Sampling 
 The same verse and chorus melody as in the song "Tvoje oči" is used for the R.E.M.'s 2001 song "All the Way to Reno (You're Gonna Be a Star)", eighteen years later.  

1983 albums
Zdravko Čolić albums